Myrtopsis is a genus of shrubs in the family Rutaceae.  The genus is  endemic to New Caledonia in the Pacific and contains c. 8 species.

List of species 

 Myrtopsis calophylla
 Myrtopsis corymbosa
 Myrtopsis deplanchei
 Myrtopsis macrocarpa
 Myrtopsis myrtoidea
 Myrtopsis novaecaledoniae
 Myrtopsis pomaderridifolia
 Myrtopsis sellingii

References

Endemic flora of New Caledonia
Zanthoxyloideae
Zanthoxyloideae genera